Jérémy Aymes (born 12 July 1988) is a French professional footballer who plays as a goalkeeper for  club Martigues.

Club career
Aymes previously played for football club Istres.

In May 2021, Aymes signed with his hometown club Martigues in the Championnat National 2.

Honours 
Martigues

 Championnat National 2: 2021–22

References

Living people
1988 births
Association football goalkeepers
French footballers
Olympique Lyonnais players
Jura Sud Foot players
FC Istres players
US Granville players
Le Mans FC players
FC Martigues players
Championnat National 3 players
Championnat National 2 players
Championnat National players
Ligue 2 players